Ripley is a city in and the county seat of Jackson County, West Virginia, United States. The population was 3,074 at the 2020 census.

History
Ripley was originally owned and settled by William, John, and Lewis Rodgers. The land was later sold to Jacob (and Ann) Starcher, most probably in 1803. Jacob Starcher erected a grist mill in 1824 and laid out the town in 1830, naming it in honor of Harry Ripley, a young minister who was to be married, but drowned in Big Mill Creek, about one and a half miles north of the town, shortly before the ceremony took place.

When Jackson County was formed in 1831, the residents of the county could not decide where to locate the county seat. The people who lived along the Ohio River near the Ravenswood settlement favored that location. The people who lived farther inland objected. The Virginia General Assembly appointed an independent commission to make the final decision which selected Ripley. In 1832, the Starchers donated  of land to the county,  for the location of the county courthouse and jail, and six for the general use of the new county (a public school and a cemetery were later located on the land). The town was chartered by the Virginia General Assembly in 1832.

The post office was established in 1832 with the name Jackson Court House. The name was shortened in 1893 to Jackson. In 1897, the name became Ripley.

During the American Civil War, Ripley remained under the control of the Union except for a brief incursion by the Confederate General Albert G. Jenkins in September 1862.

The last public hanging in West Virginia took place in Ripley in 1897, when John Morgan was hanged for murder. The spectacle prompted the West Virginia Legislature to ban public executions soon after.

Geography
Ripley is located at  (38.821078, -81.714264), along Mill Creek.

Demographics

2010 census
At the 2010 census, there were 3,252 people, 1,476 households and 854 families living in the city. The racial makeup of the city was 98.2% White, 0.2% African American, 0.4% Asian, 0.3% from other races, and 0.9% from two or more races. Hispanic or Latino of any race were 0.5% of the population.

There were 1,476 households, of which 24.7% had children under the age of 18 living with them, 42.8% were married couples living together, 11.8% had a female householder with no husband present, 3.3% had a male householder with no wife present, and 42.1% were non-families. 39.2% of all households were made up of individuals, and 19.2% had someone living alone who was 65 years of age or older. The average household size was 2.12 and the average family size was 2.81.

The median age was 46.1 years. 19.7% of residents were under the age of 18; 7.4% were between the ages of 18 and 24; 21.7% were from 25 to 44; 26.2% were from 45 to 64; and 25% were 65 years of age or older. The gender makeup of the city was 44.6% male and 55.4% female.

2000 census
At the 2000 census, there were 3,263 people, 1,423 households and 893 families living in the city. The population density was 1,056.3 per square mile (407.7/km2). There were 1,543 housing units at an average density of 499.5 per square mile (192.8/km2). The racial makeup of the city was 98.22% White, 0.06% African American, 0.06% Native American, 0.21% Asian, 0.37% from other races, and 1.07% from two or more races. Hispanic or Latino of any race were 0.64% of the population.

There were 1,423 households, of which 23.9% had children under the age of 18 living with them, 49.5% were married couples living together, 11.1% had a female householder with no husband present, and 37.2% were non-families. 34.4% of all households were made up of individuals, and 18.3% had someone living alone who was 65 years of age or older. The average household size was 2.17 and the average family size was 2.78.

19.2% of the population were under the age of 18, 8.3% from 18 to 24, 22.6% from 25 to 44, 24.0% from 45 to 64, and 25.8% who were 65 years of age or older. The median age was 45 years. For every 100 females, there were 79.8 males. For every 100 females age 18 and over, there were 73.4 males.

The median household income was $25,861 and the median income for a family was $37,027. Males had a median income of $29,531 and females $20,881. The per capita income was $15,451. About 12.1% of families and 16.4% of the population were below the poverty line, including 21.5% of those under age 18 and 9.9% of those age 65 or over.

Fourth of July celebration
Ripley claims to host the "Biggest Small Town Fourth of July Celebration" in the United States. On 4 July 2002, then President George W. Bush gave a public speech at the town's courthouse.

Education
Ripley is served by the Jackson County School District. Schools located in Ripley are:
Ripley High School (grades 9 through 12)
Ripley Middle School (grades 6 through 8)
Ripley Elementary School (grades PreK through 5)
Fairplain Elementary School (grades PreK through 5)
Jackson County Center of West Virginia University at Parkersburg

Media

Radio
WVRP (90.7 FM)-- Public Radio
WCEF (98.3 FM)-- Country

Notable people
Dee Caperton Kessel- Miss West Virginia 1964
Kane Davis - Major League Baseball pitcher
Charles C. Lanham - West Virginia State Senator and businessman, was born in Ripley.*Justin Crum US Navy Veteran PO1
Warren Miller - U.S. Representative from West Virginia

References

Cities in West Virginia
County seats in West Virginia
Cities in Jackson County, West Virginia
1830 establishments in Virginia